Lotfabad (also romanized as Loṭfābād) is a village in Bayaz Rural District, in the Central District of Anar County, Kerman Province, Iran. At the 2006 census, its population was 1,717, in 442 families.

References 

Populated places in Anar County